The 1946 The Citadel Bulldogs football team was an American football team that represented The Citadel, as a member of the Southern Conference (SoCon) during the 1946 college football season. In their first season under head coach J. Quinn Decker, the Bulldogs compiled a 3–5 record (1–5 against SoCon opponents) and were outscored by a total of 154 to 82. Albert Salvato was the team captain.

The 1946 season marked The Citadel's return to intercollegiate football after a three-year hiatus from 1943 to 1945 due to World War II.

The team played its home games at Johnson Hagood Stadium in Charleston, South Carolina.

Schedule

References

Citadel Bulldogs
The Citadel Bulldogs football seasons
Citadel football